Philippe-Servulo Desranleau (April 3, 1882 – May 28, 1952) was a Canadian Roman Catholic priest and the Archbishop of Sherbrooke from 1951 to 1952.

Born in Saint-Sébastien-d'Iberville, Quebec, Desranleau studied at the Séminaire de Saint-Hyacinthe and the Grand Séminaire de Montréal. He was ordained as a priest in 1909. In 1937, he was appointed Titular Bishop of Sala and a Coadjutor Bishop of Sherbrooke. He was appointed Bishop of Sherbrooke in 1941 and was made the first archbishop in 1951. He served until his death in 1952.

External links
 Fonds Philippe Desranleau 
 Catholic-Hierarchy entry

1882 births
1952 deaths
Roman Catholic bishops of Sherbrooke
20th-century Roman Catholic archbishops in Canada
Roman Catholic archbishops of Sherbrooke